Iron Gate Dam can refer to several places:

Iron Gate I Dam, on the Danube River between Romania and Serbia
Iron Gate II Dam, on the Danube River between Romania and Serbia
Iron Gate Dam (California), a dam on the Klamath River in the United States